The Sand Dwellers is a horror novel of the Cthulhu Mythos by author Adam Niswander.  It was published by Fedogan & Bremer in 1998 in an edition of 1,000 copies of which 100 were numbered and signed by the author and illustrator.

Plot introduction
The novel is set in the Superstition Mountains where the commander of a secret military installation is affected by strange forces that take over his mind.

References

1998 novels
Cthulhu Mythos novels
Superstition Mountains
Fedogan & Bremer books